Rom the Space Knight is a superhero, originally a toy and then a magazine lead. Rom was created by Scott Dankman, Richard C. Levy, and Bryan L. McCoy for Parker Brothers and is now a Hasbro asset. After the toy was licensed to Marvel Comics, Rom became a character that debuted in Marvel in the eponymous American comic book Rom: Spaceknight (December 1979 – February 1986), by Bill Mantlo and Sal Buscema. In July 2015, IDW Publishing began publishing a new Rom comic book series. That December, a live-action film version of Rom was in development by Allspark Pictures and Paramount.

Toy

"Rom" was a toy co-created by Scott Dankman, Richard C. Levy, and Bryan L. McCoy (US Patent #4,267,551). It was sold to Parker Brothers and was the inspiration for the comic book series Rom: Spaceknight. The toy was originally named COBOL, after the programming language, but was later changed to Rom, after ROM (read-only memory), by Parker Brothers executives.

The toy set a precedent for the game publishing company, which up until that time had only ever produced board games. As this was a new venture for the company, and given that electronic toys were still very new, a decision was made to produce the figure as cheaply as possible. As a result, the final product had very few points of articulation, and twin red LEDs served as Rom's eyes instead of the originally envisioned green, which were more expensive to produce.

Rom appeared in the corner box of the cover of Time magazine's December 10, 1979, issue. It was featured in the interior article, "Those Beeping, Thinking Toys", which decried Rom's lack of articulation and predicted it would "end up among the dust balls under the playroom sofa".

Rom was licensed to Palitoy in the United Kingdom to extend the "Space Adventurer" line of Action Man, appearing in their 1980 catalog. Ultimately, the toy failed and only sold 200,000 to 300,000 units in the US, with creator McCoy blaming the failure on poor packaging and marketing. Parker Brothers subsequently abandoned the line.

A new action figure of Rom was released for the 2017 San Diego Comic Con and at HasbroToyShop.com in limited quantities as part of the IDW Revolution set alongside figures of Jetfire (a repaint of the previously released Transformers Thrilling 30/Legends LG-07 Leader Class Jetfire figure), Roadblock, Action Man, Leoric, characters from the Micronauts, a Dire Wraith and Matt Trakker.

Publication history

Marvel Comics 
To build interest in the toy, Parker Brothers licensed the character to Marvel Comics, which created a comic book featuring Rom. The comic expanded on the premise that Rom was a cyborg and provided the character with an origin and personality, and established the character was firmly grounded in the Marvel Universe, having regular encounters with mainstream heroes and villains. Ironically the title outlasted the toy which it was created to support, with 75 issues and four Annuals (double-sized issues) published from December 1979 to February 1986.

The comic was written by Bill Mantlo and initially illustrated by artist Sal Buscema. Buscema stated in a 2010 interview: "I liked the character. And I liked what they did with it. I thought the concept was quite good. It was unique. It made it attractive to do. I almost hate to say this, but it was pretty easy to draw, too". Buscema was the main artist for the series from its creation through 1984.

IDW Publishing 
IDW Publishing licensed the character from Parker Brothers' parent company, Hasbro, and in May 2016, released Rom #0 as part of Free Comic Book Day. The free issue served as a prologue to a new ongoing series which began in July. Rom continued to be part of the Hasbro Comic Book Universe until 2018, following the Transformers: Unicron event.

A new series titled Rom: Dire Wraiths, written by Chris Ryall and drawn by Luca Pizzari, Guy Dorian and Sal Buscema, was published in January 2020.

Fictional character biography

Marvel Universe
Shown in flashback, Rom was originally human in appearance, and belonged to a utopian society on the planet Galador. When the planet was threatened by the warlike Dire Wraiths, another technologically advanced race capable of Skrull-like shapeshifting, Galador's ruler, the Prime Director, called for volunteers to be transformed into cyborg warriors called "Spaceknights". Volunteers were promised that their "humanity" (the body parts removed to accommodate the armor) would be preserved and restored to them after the danger was over.

Rom was the first to volunteer, and was transformed into a large, silver humanoid that at first glance appeared to be totally robotic. Rom was given Galador's greatest weapon, the Neutralizer, which on one setting could banish the Wraiths into the Limbo dimension forever. Inspired by his example, other Galadorians volunteered and eventually one thousand were transformed into Spaceknights—each with his or her own unique armor, powers and code names. The Spaceknights succeeded in stopping the Dire Wraith invasion, although Rom decided to follow the remnants of the fleet back to their home planet, Wraithworld (which orbited a black sun). The Dire Wraiths panicked, and after a futile counter-attack, abandoned the planet and scattered throughout space. Unable to stop Rom, the Dire Wraiths successfully used their sorcery to trick him into allowing their escape. Rom now felt responsible for spreading the Dire Wraiths' evil across the universe and swore he would not reclaim his humanity until all Dire Wraiths had been vanquished. Fellow Spaceknights, including comrades Starshine and Terminator, adopted the same oath and left Galador.

After 200 years in space, Rom arrived on Earth, landing near the fictional town of Clairton in West Virginia, United States. Rom befriended a local woman named Brandy Clark, who, after witnessing Rom deal with the Dire Wraiths, began to assist him in his mission. Those witnessing Rom's neutralizer could not see the Wraiths being banished to Limbo, leading Rom to be hunted for supposedly killing innocents.

During his time on Earth, Rom fought and banished thousands of Dire Wraiths. The increasingly desperate Dire Wraiths created new foes for Rom, including Firefall, a fusion of human and Spaceknight; the sorcerous Hellhounds; and robotic Watchwraiths. Two of Rom's greatest foes were Hybrid (the result of a union between Wraith and human), and Mentus (a suit of Spaceknight armor occupied by the dark side of the Prime Director's psyche). Other opponents were more traditional and hailed from the Marvel Universe proper, such as the Mad Thinker, the Space Phantom, and Galactus and his then-herald Terrax. He encountered such heroes as the X-Men, Power Man and Iron Fist, the Fantastic Four, Nova, the Thing, and the Hulk. Rom was one of the many heroes transported into an arena in space for the Contest of Champions, though he was not chosen to participate.

At one stage, a new breed of Dire Wraith arrived on Earth, and appeared to be far deadlier than the first variety. It was later revealed that these were females who relied on sorcery, as opposed to the weaker males who placed their faith in science. Unlike the males, the female Dire Wraiths chose not to act in secrecy and openly attacked Clairton while Rom was away, killing everyone (including Steve and superhero ally the Torpedo) with the exception of Brandy. Furthermore, they attacked S.H.I.E.L.D.'s mobile headquarters which gave Earth authorities clear evidence of the Dire Wraiths' existence and threat. So informed, the combined nations of the world pooled their resources to counter the threat, with Rom as their resident expert and leader of field operations. The Dire Wraiths came into conflict with the Avengers and the X-Men as well. Rom managed to banish all Dire Wraiths on Earth to Limbo with the aid of his super-powered allies and members of the U.S. military.

Rom left Earth soon after the battle and returned to Galador. Unknown to Rom, Brandy had accidentally met the entity called the Beyonder, and Brandy asked to be transported to Galador. The Beyonder complied and Brandy found herself on Galador, now a war-torn world occupied by a new generation of Spaceknights. Created to defend Galador in the absence of the first Spaceknights, this next generation of cyborgs became corrupted by their power, and massacred the Galadorians in a show of superiority. In an act of spite, the new Spaceknights destroyed the frozen remains of the originals. Rom arrived too late and could only save Brandy. Enraged, Rom summoned the original Spaceknights and together they destroyed the traitors. Rom then made a surprising discovery—his original humanity persisted within the entombed body of Terminator. Reclaiming it, Rom became human again and finally admitted his love for Brandy. The two chose to remain on Galador with the intent of repopulating the planet. The remaining Spaceknights, their humanity now lost, set out to explore the universe, except for a few others that remained on Galador to protect Rom and Brandy.

During Rick Jones's wedding to Marlo Chandler, the human Rom returned to Earth, together with Brandy, as guests at the ceremony, and Rom greeted the Hulk with a friendly handshake.

In the Spaceknights miniseries (Oct. 2000 – Feb. 2001), written by Jim Starlin, it is revealed that Rom took the name Artour (a reference to Brandy's love of Arthurian legends, and perhaps in memory of his own encounter with King Arthur's ghost) and that he and Brandy had two sons. Rom himself is not actually seen in the series, nor is he mentioned by that name or shown in his spaceknight form (possibly to skirt the fact that Marvel no longer held the license from Parker Brothers, which had retained the copyrights on Rom's name and armored likeness); his ship is attacked off-panel just prior to the start of the story, with Rom himself missing and presumed dead.

Spaceknight Morn, "progenitor for a new type of warrior", appears in a flashback in Cable #1 (May 2020).

Hasbro Comic Book Universe

Rom plays an important role in the Hasbro Comic Book Universe by IDW Publishing.

Two hundred years ago, Rom K'atsema lived an idyllic life with his brother and mothers on the peaceful planet Elonia, a world constantly protected by a powerful planet-wide shield that blocked debris and potential invaders. Rom studied geology at the Elonia University of Arts and Sciences, and befriended Livia and Fy-Laa. One day, the three of them investigated a mysterious meteor shower that had breached Elonia's shield and discovered that the explosive meteors were of Dire Wraith origin: weapons designed to penetrate the shield in advance of a potential Wraith invasion, and ultimately responsible for killing his family. When the Space Knights of the Solstar Order intervened, Rom learned that one of his mothers had been infected by a Wraith and transformed into one of their number. Vowing to avenge his family, Rom and his friends joined the Solstar Order as Space Knights.

On his first mission, Rom would be responsible for discovering Elonia's supply of Ore-12, a miraculous liquid metal capable of "bonding" with its wielder and becoming a permanent suit of armor. Realizing that this mysterious metal was the reason why the Dire Wraiths had attacked their world, the Solstar Order would go on to mine the rest of the ore and equip the rest of their Space Knights with the substance. Soon afterwards, Rom—now a full-fledged Space Knight—left Elonia, leaving behind a beacon in memory of his family. Over the next fifty years, Rom took part in a variety of battles against the Dire Wraiths, and participated in the massive battle that saw the Wraiths' current homeworld, within the Dark Nebula, destroyed. The Space Knights spent the next few years pursuing remnant Dire Wraith forces across backwater planets within Solstar territory.

When Rom arrived on Earth, he was misjudged as Cybertronian. He killed a Dire Wraith impersonating General Joseph Colton, which later exposed the Wraith infiltration around Earth. In time, he gained new allies like the Micronauts, and together, they stopped Baron Karza and the Presence (the Wraith goddess). When Unicron arrived, it destroyed Elonia, which caused Rom to learn more about the monster and its link to the Dire Wraiths' creation. When Unicron was destroyed thanks to Optimus Prime's sacrifice, Rom and the surviving Elonians accepted Earth as their new homeworld, and Rom and Livia rekindled their previous relationship.

Powers and abilities
Rom's armor was composed of the Galadorian metal plandanium.  It is extremely durable, even able to stand up to Wolverine's adamantium claws. It was shown to be damaged from time to time, demonstrating that plandanium is not indestructible. The armor had self-repair capabilities, though it took several weeks to repair major damage. It provided him with superhuman strength, flight, and the ability to travel through space via backpack rockets. It allowed him to breathe in any atmosphere and survive in the vacuum of space. In Spaceknight form, Rom also did not need to eat or sleep. Controls near the torso allowed Rom to lower the armor's temperature to well below zero. The armor stored a "solar charge" that could be used as a weapon and could drain power sources by mere contact. It gave him the ability to summon three pieces of equipment stored in "subspace".
Neutralizer Rom's primary weapon, which is designed to banish Dire Wraiths to Limbo by opening a dimensional portal, but the process leaves considerable waste material (ash, etc.) that makes it appear to an uninformed observer that the weapon kills its target. This handheld weapon could fire energy beams that could be deadly at a high setting. It could also neutralize various forms of energy. The device was designed so that only Rom would be able to discharge it. The Dire Wraiths unsuccessfully explored the possibility of examining the weapon to find some means of returning its victims to the normal dimension. The mutant Wolverine once tried to use the weapon and received a numbing blast of energy feedback. Rom's Neutralizer would inspire a similar creation by the mutant Forge when the US government tasked him with constructing a weapon against the Wraith horde. Forge's neutralizer, for a time, cost Storm her mutant abilities.
Analyzer  This device allowed Rom to see shape-changing Dire Wraiths in their true form and could assess the energy and potential of any object/entity. It could be used on an item which represented a world, such as a globe, and would display lights corresponding to Dire Wraith infestations at that point on the planet. The device resembles a handgun, and Dire Wraith imposters took advantage of this fact to fool others into thinking that Rom was attacking them. Rom once arranged for an ally to have the equivalent kind of vision, but the Dire Wraiths counteracted that by magically blocking his mind from recognizing that particular visual data. Regardless, Rom allowed SHIELD to examine the Analyzer in hopes of creating equivalent devices among the Spaceknight's human allies. In the new "Rom" series by IDW, his energy Analyzer is represented as two red lenses mounted on his arms. The arms transform to reveal the lenses, which emit a red light when in operation.
Universal Translator Rom instantly learned the language of any creature, irrespective of their origin. This device was used to scan and store printed information from an encyclopedia in Rom's memory banks for future use. In the IDW series, the Translator is not a separate piece of equipment, but a function of Rom himself. When he first speaks, he uses an alien language before shifting to English, seemingly mid-sentence.

Other versions
As Marvel Comics no longer possesses the licensing rights to Rom from Parker Brothers, the character is not allowed to appear in his armored form. Marvel has found ways to work around this dilemma.
 In 2000, Marvel published a five-issue SpaceKnights series which featured a hero named Prince Tristan (codenamed "Liberator") in a redesigned version of Rom's armor. He fought alongside other SpaceKnights named after some of the more popular ones from the original series.
 In the Captain Marvel series featuring Genis-Vell, Rick Jones was shown to own a toaster in the shape of Rom's helmet.
 In the alternate world of Earth X, Rom had been banished to Limbo and was battling against the Dire Wraiths he had sent there. Rom was seen in human form wielding his Neutralizer and using his chest-plate as a shield. He was referred to only as "the Greatest Spaceknight".
 In The Avengers #12.1, the super-villain group, The Intelligencia, was seen working with a 'spaceknight' that had actually been a vessel for Ultron in his digital form, which he proceeds to reconstruct into his own likeness.

Reprint omissions
As of 2022, no reprints or collections of the Marvel series have been produced due to Marvel's loss of the rights to Rom and the appearance of many Marvel owned characters throughout the series. 

Legal issues regarding the reprinting of Rom guest appearances in other comics have led to complications. Brief cameos such as a holographic version of the character appearing as a distraction in Uncanny X-Men #187 have remained intact as have the Rom entries in the Essential Marvel trade paperbacks for the original Official Handbook of the Marvel Universe and its deluxe edition sequel. The cover of the Essential Official Handbook of the Marvel Universe removed Rom from the artwork used for the cover of the collection.

Several appearances by Rom have been outright omitted from reprint editions. Power Man and Iron Fist #73, which featured Rom, was omitted from Essential Power Man and Iron Fist vol. 1, and similarly Marvel Two-in-One #99 was omitted from Essential Marvel Two-in-One vol. 4, while The Incredible Hulk: Regression trade paperback features a heavily edited version of The Incredible Hulk #296, removing Rom's entire appearance in the issue. Furthermore, Rom #72, which was a tie-in to the Secret Wars II series, was omitted from the Secret Wars II Omnibus.

In other media
In December 2015, Hasbro Studios (later folded into Entertainment One in 2019) and Paramount Pictures were planning a cinematic universe featuring Rom and a number of other licensed toy characters, including G.I. Joe, Micronauts, Visionaries: Knights of the Magical Light, and M.A.S.K. Michael Chabon, Brian K. Vaughan, Nicole Perlman, Lindsey Beer, Cheo Coker, John Francis Daley, Jonathan Goldstein, Joe Robert Cole, Jeff Pinkner, Nicole Riegel, and Geneva Robertson joined to the writing team for the project. By March 2018, Zak Penn had signed on to write the Rom film's script.

Explanatory notes

References

External links
 
 Rom Spaceknight revisited!
 Rom Spaceknight.com
 Rom If You Want To, Rom Around The World, Part 1, 2 and 3, Comics 101, August 9–23, 2006
 
 Rom and Rom (Volume) at Comic Vine

 
Marvel Comics male superheroes
1979 comics debuts
1986 comics endings
Characters created by Bill Mantlo
Characters created by Sal Buscema
Comics characters introduced in 1979
Cyborg superheroes
Marvel Comics characters with superhuman strength
Marvel Comics extraterrestrial superheroes
Marvel Comics cyborgs
Fictional extraterrestrial cyborgs
Fictional knights
IDW Publishing titles
Marvel Comics titles
Comics based on Hasbro toys
Parker Brothers